Edward Arnold Burkhardt is a railroad executive, the founder and current chairman of Rail World Inc.

Career
After gaining a B.S. with honors in Industrial Administration from Yale University and studying Rail Transportation at Yale's graduate school, Burkhardt initially worked for the Wabash Railroad. He was then an executive with Chicago and North Western Transportation, first as vice president of marketing and then vice president of operations.

Wisconsin Central Transportation Corporation
Following passage of the Staggers Rail Act, on April 3, 1987, Soo Line Railroad announced the sale of its Lake States Transportation Division to private investors led by Burkhardt and Thomas F. Power Jr., former chief financial officer at the Milwaukee Road, creating the new Wisconsin Central Transportation Corporation. The first WC train ran from Stevens Point to North Fond du Lac, Wisconsin on October 11, 1987. Burkhardt served as chairman, president and chief executive officer of the company for 12 years, during which WCTC also:
Bought Algoma Central Railway
Chairman and CEO of English Welsh & Scottish Railway, that bought five railway operations from the British Railways Board, handling 93% of rail freight in the United Kingdom
Founded the Australian Transport Network, which purchased Tasrail and the Emu Bay Railway
Named Railroader of the Year in 1999 by industry trade journal Railway Age magazine

There was a "fiery 1996 train wreck in Weyauwega" prominent amongst safety problems that emerged during Burkhardt's tenure. By 1997 the WC stock price had peaked and began to decline.  At the same time, the foreign holdings of WCLX suffered poor returns from 1997–1999.  Management issues at WC became apparent as Burkhardt favored investment for the long term whereas Power favored cutting expenses; this reportedly led to frequent clashes between the two executives and culminated in a July 7, 1999, special meeting of the WCLX board of directors in which Burkhardt was asked to resign.

After a failed proxy battle, in 2001 WCTC and the former Illinois Central Railroad were purchased by Canadian National Railway, and merged into their United States holdings. The overseas railroad holdings were put up for sale, and have slowly been sold off.

Honorary Consul
In 1997, Edward Burkhardt, while still serving as the CEO and President of Wisconsin Central Transportation Company, was appointed by the New Zealand government as its honorary consul to Chicago. Previously, he had led the privatisation of New Zealand Rail during the 1990s and also served as chairman of Tranz Rail Holdings for six years, between September 1993 and August 1999.

Rail World
In July 1999 Rail World was incorporated by Burkhardt, who is the president and chief executive officer. As part of Rail World operations:
Bought the Montreal, Maine and Atlantic Railway with a 75% share ownership. 
Led the Estonian Railways privatization in 2001, and served as chairman until the company was repurchased by the Estonian government in 2007
Founded Rail Polska, which has an unrestricted operator license on the Polish rail network.

Lac-Mégantic derailment
A derailment at Lac-Mégantic, Quebec, Canada of a runaway Montreal, Maine and Atlantic Railway oil train on July 6, 2013 killed forty-seven of the townfolk and incinerated much of the downtown. Burkhardt waited four days before visiting Lac-Mégantic; on his July 10, 2013 arrival, he was heckled by residents.

As a result of the incident the safety record of MM&A was called into question, particularly with respect to Burkhardt's one-crew policy. Under Burkhardt's ownership and control over the previous decade, MM&A recorded an accident rate higher than rest of the US rail fleet, according to data from the Federal Railroad Administration. For instance, in the year prior to the  Lac-Mégantic accident, MM&A had an accident rate more than twice the national average—36.1 accidents per million miles traveled, compared to a national average of 14.6. The Toronto Star also noted that "when Burkhardt took over in 2003, he cut employee wages by 40 per cent" and "locomotive crews were cut in half, replacing two workers with one." Following the Lac-Mégantic disaster Burkhardt initially blamed the Nantes, Quebec fire brigade for shutting down the unattended locomotive to extinguish an engine fire, then he announced that the railway had suspended Tom Harding, the engineer and only crew-member of the runaway train, for improperly setting the handbrakes on the rail cars before retiring for the night to a local motel.

On August 6, 2013, Burkhardt stated that MM&A has no further plans to carry oil by rail. The next day, MM&A filed for bankruptcy protection under US Chapter 11 and Canada's Companies Creditors Arrangement Act. The Canadian Transportation Agency shut down the remaining Canadian MM&A operations effective August 20, citing inadequate liability insurance.  The Canadian Transportation Agency, a quasi-judicial administrative court, had approved MM&A’s insurance coverage in 2002, and the railway had renewed its Certificate of Fitness, which is the license to operate with the CTA, annually since then.  Section 94(1) of the Canada Transportation Act mandates the conditions under which "The holder of a certificate of fitness shall notify the Agency in writing without delay if (a) the liability insurance coverage is cancelled or altered so that it may no longer be adequate; or (b) the construction or operation has changed so that the liability insurance coverage may no longer be adequate,"  and a significant change in MM&A operations had occurred with the initiation of crude oil shipments on MM&A trains in April 2012, yet Burkhardt failed to inform the CTA of the change.  As of 12 September 2013, the Canadian authorities had not yet completed their investigation of the Lac-Megantic derailment incident. According to news reports on March 22, 2014, the Quebec police had completed their investigation and turned the files over to prosecutors who were expected to file charges on criminal negligence against Burkhardt.

Criminal negligence charges were ultimately filed against MM&A as a corporation and against three individual workers (the dispatcher, engineer and operations manager).

References

External links
Bio at Rail World Inc.

1938 births
Living people
People from Kenilworth, Illinois
Yale School of Management alumni
20th-century American railroad executives
American railroaders
Honorary Consuls to the United States